Ferenc Soos is a male former international table tennis player from Hungary.

Table tennis career
He won twelve medals in singles, doubles, and team events in the World Table Tennis Championships in 1936 to 1950.

The twelve World Championship medals included four gold medals; two in the team event, one in the mixed doubles at the 1947 World Table Tennis Championships with Gizi Farkas and one in the men's doubles at the 1950 World Table Tennis Championships with Ferenc Sidó.

See also
 List of table tennis players
 List of World Table Tennis Championships medalists

References

Hungarian male table tennis players
20th-century Hungarian people